Roma railway station is located on the Western line in Queensland, Australia. It serves the town of Roma. The station has one platform, opening in 1880.

Services
Roma is served by Queensland Rail Travel's twice weekly Westlander service travelling between Brisbane and Charleville. until 1993, Roma was served by a rail motor service that travelled to Roma Street railway station via Wallumbilla, Yuleba, Miles, Chinchilla, Dalby, Oakey and Toowoomba in conjunction with a railbus service operated by McCafferty's.

References

External links

Roma station Queensland's Railways on the Internet

Maranoa Region
Railway stations in Australia opened in 1880
Regional railway stations in Queensland
Western railway line, Queensland